Lokve is a village in western Slovenia in the Municipality of Nova Gorica. It is located on the Trnovo Forest Plateau, above the Vipava Valley in the Gorizia region of the Slovene Littoral. It is a popular tourist center, serving as a summer resort for people from the towns of Nova Gorica and Gorizia (Italy). Škol Hill rises north of Lokve.

Mass grave
Lokve is the site of a former mass grave from the Second World War. The Lokve Mass Grave is located in a depression near house no. 43 in the village. It contained the remains of Italian soldiers from the 10th Assault Vehicle Flotilla killed at the site in March 1945. The remains were discovered during excavations in December 2003 and were reburied in May 2004.

Church
The parish church in the settlement is dedicated to Saint Anthony of Padua and belongs to the Diocese of Koper.

Notable people
Notable people that were born or lived in Lokve include: 
Leon Rupnik (1880–1946), general
Venceslav Winkler (1907–1975), writer

See also
Gorizia and Gradisca
Austrian Littoral
Julian March
Tourism in Slovenia

References

External links

Lokve on Geopedia

Populated places in the City Municipality of Nova Gorica